Stenocaecilius casarum is a species of lizard barklouse in the family Caeciliusidae. It is found in Africa, Australia, the Caribbean, Central America, North America, Oceania, South America, and Southern Asia.

References

Caeciliusidae
Articles created by Qbugbot
Insects described in 1931